The 2008–09 Slovak Extraliga season was the 16th season of the Slovak Extraliga, the top level of ice hockey in Slovakia. 13 teams participated in the league, and HC Kosice won the championship.

Standings

First round

Group round

Championship round

Qualification

Playoffs

Quarterfinals

 HC Košice – HC 05 Banská Bystrica 4–1 (4–2, 5–3, 3–6, 2–1 SN, 4–0)
 HC Slovan Bratislava – MHC Martin 4–1 (3–0, 4–0, 4–1, 2–4, 10–3)
 HK 36 Skalica – Dukla Trenčín 4–0 (2–0, 3–1, 3–1, 3–2)
 HKm Zvolen – MHk 32 Liptovský Mikuláš 4–2 (1–2, 5–2, 1–2, 3–2 SN, 6–1, 2–0)

Semifinals 

 HC Košice – HKm Zvolen 4–3 (2–1 P, 1–3, 1–4, 5–0, 3–1, 3–4, 8–2)

 HC Slovan Bratislava – HK 36 Skalica 3–4 (6–8, 4–1, 3–6, 6–3, 4–2, 1–3, 2–3 P)

Final
HC Košice – HK 36 Skalica 4–2  (4–2, 3–1, 5–2, 2–8, 3–4 SN, 3–2 SN)

Play-outs

Relegation
 HK Spišská Nová Ves – MHK SkiPark Kežmarok 4:1 (3:2, 1:0, 4:2, 2:5, 3:1)
 HK Aquacity ŠKP Poprad – ŠHK 37 Piešťany 4:0 (9:2, 6:2, 4:3, 2:1 OT)

External links
 Slovak Ice Hockey Federation

Slovak Extraliga seasons
2008–09 in European ice hockey leagues
Slovak